The 1st Iowa Infantry Regiment Colored was an African-American infantry regiment that served in the Union Army during the American Civil War.

Service
The first six companies of the 1st Iowa Infantry Colored was organized at Keokuk, Iowa and mustered into Federal forces on October 11, 1863 and on March 11, 1864 was redesignated the 60th United States Colored Infantry Regiment.  Four additional companies were added before the end of the year.  The regiment served as part of the garrison of the Department of Arkansas for its entire existence.

Total strength and casualties
A total of  1153 men served in the 1st Iowa Colored during its existence.
It suffered 12 combat fatalities,1 officer and 11 enlisted men, who were killed in action or who died of their wounds. The unit also suffered the loss of 332 enlisted men who died of disease, for a total of 344 fatalities.

Commanders
 Colonel John G. Hudson

See also

List of Iowa Civil War Units
Iowa in the American Civil War

Notes

References
The Civil War Archive

Infantry, 001
Iowa Infantry, 001
1863 establishments in Iowa
Military units and formations established in 1863
Military units and formations disestablished in 1864
1864 disestablishments in Iowa